The Global Wrestling Federation was a professional wrestling promotion based in Dallas, Texas from 1991 to 1994. Former employees in the GWF consisted of professional wrestlers, managers, play-by-play and color commentators, announcers, interviewers and referees.

Alumni

Male wrestlers

Female wrestlers

Stables and tag teams

Managers and valets

Commentators and interviewers

Referees

References
General

Specific

External links
Global Wrestling Federation alumni at Cagematch.net
Global Wrestling Federation alumni at OWW.com
Global Wrestling Federation alumni at Wrestlingdata.com

Global Wrestling Federation alumni